Brian Walton may refer to:

Brian Walton (bishop) (1600–1661), English divine and scholar
Brian Walton (cyclist) (born 1965), Canadian cycling coach and former bicycle racer